The 1926–27 season was the 27th season of competitive football in Belgium. This was the first season after the major reform of Belgian football. The Belgian Cup was first played since World War I and won by RCS Brugeois. They also won the Premier Division making the second double in Belgian football after Union Saint-Gilloise in 1912-13. R Liersche SK won the Division I now the second level of football and thus promoted for the next Premier Division along with the runner-up SC Anderlechtois. Both clubs replaced FC Malinois and CS La Forestoise at the highest level. A third level of football was introduced, named Promotion and played in 3 leagues of 14 clubs. The leagues were won by Courtrai Sports, CS Tongrois and Fléron FC. All 3 clubs promoted to the Division I, while AS Herstalienne, Saint-Ignace SC Antwerpen and SRU Verviers were all relegated to the Promotion.

National team

* Belgium score given first

Key
 H = Home match
 A = Away match
 N = On neutral ground
 F = Friendly
 o.g. = own goal

Honours

Final league tables

Premier Division

Division I

External links
RSSSF archive - Final tables 1895-2002
Belgian clubs history